Ivan Ivanov (Kazakh or Russian: Иван Иванов; born 3 January 1992) is a Kazakhstani shot putter. He competed at the 2016 Summer Olympics without qualifying for the final. Ivanov won bronze medals at the 2017 Asian Championships and 2018 Asian Games. His personal bests in the event are 20.95 metres outdoors (Almaty 2019) and 20.51 metres indoors (Ust-Kamenogorsk 2016), both being the current national records.

Ivanov took up shot put in 2006 following his brother. A month later, aged 14, he competed at his first national championships. He regularly trains in Portugal because his coach Vladimir Zinchenko is based in that country.

International competitions

References

1992 births
Living people
Kazakhstani male shot putters
Athletes (track and field) at the 2016 Summer Olympics
Olympic athletes of Kazakhstan
People from Almaty Region
Medalists at the 2018 Asian Games
Asian Games bronze medalists for Kazakhstan
Athletes (track and field) at the 2018 Asian Games
Asian Games medalists in athletics (track and field)